The Strength of Serbia Movement – BK (PSS–BK) is a conservative political party in Serbia.

History 
Party was founded in 2004. Its founder and current leader of PSS-BK is Bogoljub Karić, Serbian businessman and tycoon under criminal charges in flight. Since the 2012 parliamentary election its member of the big tent and populist coalition around the ruling Serbian Progressive Party (SNS).

Political positions 
PSS has been described as a conservative, liberal-conservative, populist, and pro-Russian party. It is positioned on the centre-right on the political spectrum.

Electoral performance

Parliamentary elections

Presidential elections

Provincial elections 
The Movement received 42,813 votes (6.69%) and won 4 seats in the first round of the 2004 Vojvodina parliamentary elections and additional 3 seats in the second round, by majority system.

References

External links 
Official website

2004 establishments in Serbia
Conservative parties in Serbia
Political parties established in 2004
Pro-European political parties in Serbia